Leonel Da Silva Araujo, also known as Leonel (born July 5, 1986) is a football player. He is the current goalkeeper for the Timor-Leste national football team.

References

1986 births
Living people
East Timorese footballers
Association football goalkeepers
Timor-Leste international footballers
F.C. Porto Taibesi players